This is a list of Swedish mine warfare vessels.

 Minelayers 

Active

 
 

Decommissioned

 
 

Minesweepers

Active (1982-1992) 
 
 
 
 
 
  (1996-1997) 
 
 
  (2004) - upgraded from Styrsö class.
 
  (2008-2009) - upgraded from Landsort class.
 
 
 
 
 

Decommissioned  
 
  
  
 
 
 
 
 
 
 
 
 
 
 
 
  
 
 
 
 
 
 
 
 
 
 
 

Coastal minesweepers 
  - reclassified as patrol boat 1979
  - reclassified as patrol boat 1979
  - reclassified as patrol boat 1979
  - reclassified as patrol boat 1979
 '''

M-series

  (1937)
  (1937)
  (1940)
  (1940)
  (1940)
  (1940)
  (1940)
  (1941)
  (1940)
  (1940)
  (1940)
  (1941)
  (1940)
  (1941)
  (1941)
  (1941)
  (1941)
  (1941)
  (1941)
  (1941)
  (1941)
  (1941)
  (1941)
  (1941)
  (1941)
  (1941)

References

External links

 
 
mine warfare vessels
Swedish Navy